PopGun Presents is an events production/promotion, music curation and venue management collective based in Brooklyn, NY. It was founded in 2008 by Rami Haykal and Jake Rosenthal.

The PopGun Presents website features event photo galleries and a blog publishing periodic playlists, music features, and artist interviews.

Formation 

In 2008, Haykal and Rosenthal started Popgun Booking, collaborating with the independent label Cantora Records on a residency at The Delancey in the Lower East Side of Manhattan called Loose Nukes. Das Racist, Savoir Adore, and Free Blood and were some of the bands that played during this period.

PopGun also acted as booking agents for some emerging artists including Anamanaguchi, Savoire Adore, Darwin Deez, Mon Khmer and others.

At Glasslands and other venues 

In late 2008, PopGun booked a number of  one-off events at Glassland Gallery. They established a monthly event that featured acts such as The Secret Machines, Telepathe, Bear In Heaven, Hercules & Love Affair, Holy Ghost, and Marnie Stern, often presenting five or more bands performing late into the night. After several months, PopGun was offered control of in-house talent buying for Glasslands, making them the primary decision-makers for programming at the venue.

At Glasslands, PopGun produced shows primarily in the indie rock and alternative pop vein, branching out into electronic music, folk, hip-hop and heavy metal. Glasslands’ 300-capacity size and production quality attracted buzz artists as well as established acts. During this early period they frequently worked with Brooklyn-based artists such as MGMT, Chairlift, Dev Hynes and Yeasayer, while also importing national and international artists including Wild Nothing, Future Islands and Tame Impala.
 
In 2010, PopGun served as the in-house talent buying team for Santos Party House. With the online zine Stereogum, they set up Stereo Gun CMJ showcases. They continued working with Stereogum on the CMJ festival over the following two years at Glasslands.

Owning Glasslands 
In late 2011, Haykal and Rosenthal took ownership of Glasslands Gallery. PopGun moved its offices from 35 Meadow St in Brooklyn to the back of Glasslands and continued to make improvements to the venue, including new bathrooms, green rooms for the artists, and improved sound systems. As a result, the venue was able to attract more major touring acts.
 
Around this time, PopGun started pursuing more electronic producers and DJs, bringing in rising names like Baauer, Disclosure and Omar S for late weekend night parties.

In Bushwick 

Glasslands closed on January 1, 2015 due to a building purchase by Vice Media. In the summer prior to the closing, Haykal and Rosenthal had been collectively named one of “Brooklyn’s Greatest Influencers in a Place Full of Music Influencers” by Brooklyn Magazine. The following year, Haykal was named one “20 People Defining Music” by the same periodical.

After the venue closed, PopGun moved its offices again to Bushwick, and continues to promote concerts at a multitude of venues.

On June 29, 2016 the New York Times revealed that Haykal, Rosenthal and partner Dhruv Chopra were preparing to open Elsewhere, a 24,000 square foot venue and art space in Bushwick. The venue will reportedly feature five partitions: A 5,000 square-foot main room, another 1,200 square-foot performance space, a rooftop bar, the Loft Bar, and the Skybridge Gallery.

External links 

 PopGun Presents website

References 

Music companies of the United States